The Bengal Hooch Tragedy may refer to two different but similar events:
 2011 Bengal hooch tragedy
 2015 Bengal hooch tragedy
In each case, a large number of people died in West Bengal after consumption of liquor mixed with methanol.